is a Japanese manga series written and illustrated by Yasunori Mitsunaga. It was serialized in Kodansha's shōnen manga magazine Monthly Shōnen Sirius from December 2015 to September 2017, with its chapters collected in six tankōbon volumes.

Publication
Written and illustrated by Yasunori Mitsunaga, Avarth was serialized in Kodansha's shōnen manga magazine Monthly Shōnen Sirius from December 26, 2015, to September 26, 2017. Kodansha collected its chapters in six tankōbon volumes, released from May 9, 2016, to November 9, 2017.

Volume list

See also
Princess Resurrection, another manga series by the same author
Isekai Sniper wa Onna Senshi no Mofumofu Pet, another manga series by the same author
Time Stop Hero, another manga series by the same author

References

Further reading

Dark fantasy anime and manga
Kodansha manga
Shōnen manga